Kan Khan may refer to:

Kan Khan-e Masumeh
Kan Khan-e Yaqub